James Thomson Cooper (born 28 December 1939), commonly known as Jim or Jimmy Cooper, is a Scottish former professional footballer who played as a winger in the Scottish League for Raith Rovers and Airdrieonians and in the English Football League for Brighton & Hove Albion and Hartlepools United.

Life and career
Cooper was born in Glasgow in 1939. A right-footed winger with considerable pace, he joined Raith Rovers from junior club Ardeer Thistle in December 1965. He made nine appearances in the 1960–61 Scottish Division One season as his team finished just above the relegation places, and the following season he scored twice from eight appearances for Airdrieonians as they avoided the drop by an even narrower margin. After a trial, Cooper signed for English club Brighton & Hove Albion, newly relegated to the Football League Third Division. He played in around half the matches as the team suffered a second consecutive relegation, and a similar number in 1963–64. After his third season was spent entirely in the reserves, he signed for Hartlepools United, where he made 22 appearances in all competitions, and then moved into South African football with Addington and Cape Town City.

References

1939 births
Living people
Footballers from Glasgow
Scottish footballers
Association football wingers
Ardeer Thistle F.C. players
Raith Rovers F.C. players
Airdrieonians F.C. (1878) players
Brighton & Hove Albion F.C. players
Hartlepool United F.C. players
Addington F.C. players
Cape Town City F.C. (NFL) players
Scottish Junior Football Association players
Scottish Football League players
English Football League players
National Football League (South Africa) players